{{DISPLAYTITLE:C23H27N3O2}}
The molecular formula C23H27N3O2 (molar mass: 377.48 g/mol, exact mass: 377.2103 u) may refer to:

 CUMYL-THPINACA (SGT-42)
 Morazone

Molecular formulas